A hexahedron (plural: hexahedra or hexahedrons) or sexahedron (plural: sexahedra or sexahedrons) is any polyhedron with six faces. A cube, for example, is a regular hexahedron with all its faces square, and three squares around each vertex.

There are seven topologically distinct convex hexahedra, one of which exists in two mirror image forms. There are three topologically distinct concave hexahedra. Two polyhedra are "topologically distinct" if they have intrinsically different arrangements of faces and vertices, such that it is impossible to distort one into the other simply by changing the lengths of edges or the angles between edges or faces.

Convex, Cuboid

Convex, Others

Concave
There are three further topologically distinct hexahedra that can only be realised as concave figures:

A digonal antiprism can be considered a degenerate form of hexahedron, having two opposing digonal faces and four triangular faces. However, digons are usually disregarded in the definition of non-spherical polyhedra, and this case is often simply considered a tetrahedron and the four remaining triangular faces considered to compose the full solid.

See also
 Prismatoid

References

External links
Polyhedra with 4-7 Faces by Steven Dutch

6 (number)
Polyhedra